Gleneonupserha is a genus of longhorn beetles of the subfamily Lamiinae, containing the following species:

 Gleneonupserha elongata Breuning, 1949
 Gleneonupserha vaga (Gahan, 1909)
 Gleneonupserha vitticollis Breuning, 1950

References

Saperdini